Gəndov (also, Gyandov and Gendov) is a village and municipality in the Lerik Rayon of Azerbaijan.  It has a population of 292.

References 

Populated places in Lerik District